The Roman Catholic Diocese of Tete is a diocese located in the city of Tete in the Ecclesiastical province of Beira in Mozambique.

History
 May 6, 1962: Established as Diocese of Tete from the Diocese of Beira

Leadership
 Bishops of Tete (Roman rite)
 Bishop Félix Niza Ribeiro (20 December 1962 – 19 February 1972), appointed Bishop of João Belo
 Bishop Augusto César Alves Ferreira da Silva, C.M. (19 February 1972 – 31 May 1976)
 Bishop Paulo Mandlate, S.S.S. (31 May 1976 — 18 April 2009)
 Bishop Inácio Saure, I.M.C. (12 April 2011 — 11 April 2017), appointed Archbishop of Nampula
Bishop Diamantino Guapo Antunes, I.M.C. (22 Mar 2019–present)

See also
Roman Catholicism in Mozambique

Sources
 GCatholic.org
 Catholic Hierarchy

External links
 https://web.archive.org/web/20100530101507/http://www.diocesedetete.org.mz/

Tete
Christian organizations established in 1962
Roman Catholic dioceses and prelatures established in the 20th century
Tete, Mozambique
1962 establishments in Mozambique
Roman Catholic Ecclesiastical Province of Beira